Live at the Palace is a live album recorded at The Palace in Hollywood on October 11, 1995, by the band Blind Melon. It is the fourth album featuring vocals from former Blind Melon frontman Shannon Hoon before his death, recorded ten days before Hoon's passing.

Track listing
"Galaxie"
"Toes Across the Floor"
"Tones of Home"
"Soup"
"Soak the Sin"
"Change"
"No Rain"
"Wilt"
"Vernie"
"Walk"
"Skinned"
"Time"

Note: Album was re-released on October 17, 2006, with new artwork and correct track listing as shown above. The track listing on the original artwork above is incorrect.

References

External sources
Starpulse review
CDUniverse track listing

Blind Melon albums
2006 live albums
Capitol Records live albums